Charles Impellizzeri (died 1656) was a Roman Catholic prelate who served as Bishop of Mazara del Vallo (1650–1656).

Biography
On 19 December 1650, Charles Impellizzeri was appointed during the papacy of Pope Innocent X as Bishop of Mazara del Vallo. On 8 January 1651, he was consecrated bishop. He served as Bishop of Mazara del Vallo until his death on 1656.

References

External links and additional sources
 (for Chronology of Bishops) 
 (for Chronology of Bishops) 

17th-century Roman Catholic bishops in Sicily
1656 deaths
Bishops appointed by Pope Innocent X